Oving may refer to:

Oving, Buckinghamshire
Oving, West Sussex